Ichneumon may refer to:
 Ichneumon (genus), a genus of wasps
 Ichneumon, species of wasps in the family Ichneumonidae
 Ichneumon, an alternative name for the Egyptian mongoose
 Ichneumon (medieval zoology), the enemy of the dragon in medieval literature